Brownrigg is a surname. Notable people with the surname include:

John Brownrigg (disambiguation)
Abraham Brownrigg (1836–1928), Irish Roman Catholic Bishop of Ossory from 1884
Andy Brownrigg (1976-), English footballer
Douglas Brownrigg (1886-1946), senior British Army officer who became Military Secretary
Elizabeth Brownrigg (1720-1767), English murderer
George Brownrigg (1896–1981), Irish first-class cricketer
Henry Brownrigg (disambiguation)
Kyle Brownrigg, Canadian stand-up comedian
Ralph Brownrigg (1592–1659), former bishop of Exeter
Robert Brownrigg (1759−1833), British statesman and soldier
S. F. Brownrigg (1937–1996), American film director and producer
Studholme Brownrigg (1882–1943), British admiral
Sylvia Brownrigg (b. 1964), American author
William Brownrigg (1711–1800), doctor and scientist

See also 

 Brownrigg baronets